Euxoa canariensis is a moth of the family Noctuidae. It is found from the Canary Islands throughout the arid and semi-arid areas of North Africa to Arabia, Israel, Jordan, Iran and Afghanistan.

Adults are on wing in March to May. There is one generation per year.

Subspecies
Euxoa canariensis canariensis
Euxoa canariensis mauretanica (North Africa)
Euxoa canariensis diamondi (Israel, United Arab Emirates)

External links
 Noctuinae of Israel

Euxoa
Moths of the Middle East
Moths described in 1902